is a former member of the Supreme Court of Japan from 2001 until 2006.

Until his appointment to the court, he worked in private practice, initially at Anderson, Mori & Rabinowitz and Pillsbury, Madison & Sutro. He founded the law firm of Yanagida & Hamada in 1972, his portion of which eventually became part of Mori Hamada & Matsumoto.

In November 2007, he was awarded the Grand Cordon of the Order of the Rising Sun, by the Japanese Government for his public service.

References

Supreme Court of Japan justices
Living people
1936 births
Law firm founders